= High Flying George =

1927 film

- Release date: 1927
- Country: United States
- Language: Silent (English intertitles)

High Flying George (aka High-Flying George) is a 1927 American film comedy depicting a wedding taking place on an aircraft. By 1927, the aerial stunt of an airborne wedding was becoming a commonplace Hollywood stunt.

== Plot ==
George, an amorous Romeo has an idea to make his upcoming wedding a unique event. Seeing that a pilot is advertising a wedding "in the sky", George signs up but finds he is not the only one who will be flying.

Two couples are going to be wed by a priest who administers the oaths. George and his fiancé wait their turn on the top wing of a Curtiss Jenny biplane, with the banner "Just Married" on its fuselage.

== Production ==
Principal photography on High Flying George took place in 1927. A recent commentary on the production is that "The airplane wedding was a movie commonplace by the time of "High Flying George", 1927.

== Reception ==
Aviation film historian James Farmer in Celluloid Wings: The Impact of Movies on Aviation (1984) described High Flying George, a minor piece, highlighting an "airborne wedding in a Curtiss Jenny." High Flying George was advertised as an "extra added attraction" and a "novelty comedy".
